Gregory Robert Hay (born 14 July 1984) is a New Zealand cricketer who plays for the Central Districts and for Nelson in the Hawke Cup competition.

Plying career
After scoring 98 on first-class debut, he went on to continue scoring runs for the Stags, scoring 55 on List A debut. He currently plays in Minor League Cricket for the San Diego Surf Riders.

He was the leading run-scorer in the 2017–18 Plunket Shield season for Central Districts, with 786 runs in nine matches. In June 2018, he was awarded a contract with Central Districts for the 2018–19 season. He was also the leading run-scorer for Central Districts in the 2018–19 Ford Trophy, with 351 runs in eight matches.

Hay was selected by the San Diego Surf Riders for the 2022 edition of Minor League Cricket. He scored an unbeaten 110 off 60 runs in his 7th appearance in a loss to the Bay Blazers.

References

External links
 

1984 births
Living people
New Zealand cricketers
Central Districts cricketers
Sportspeople from Rotorua